Rafael Valls Ferri (born 25 June 1987) is a Spanish professional road bicycle racer, who last rode for UCI WorldTeam .

Career
Born in Cocentaina, Valls left  at the end of the 2013 season, and joined  for the 2014 season. In 2015, Valls had his biggest victory to date by winning the Tour of Oman and its fourth stage. In September 2015 it was announced that Valls would join  from 2016 on a two-year deal. In August 2020, he was named in the startlist for the 2020 Tour de France. However, he crashed on the opening stage, and abandoned the race.

Major results

2005
 3rd Time trial, National Junior Road Championships
2008
 9th Overall Grand Prix du Portugal
2009
 4th Overall Circuito Montañés
 10th Overall Tour de l'Avenir
2010
 2nd Trofeo Inca
 3rd Overall Tour de San Luis
1st  Mountains classification
1st Stage 2
 9th Trofeo Deia
2014
 8th Overall Settimana Internazionale di Coppi e Bartali
2015
 1st  Overall Tour of Oman
1st Stage 4
 8th Overall Paris–Nice
 8th Overall Volta a Catalunya
2016
 8th Overall Tour Down Under
2017
 7th Overall Tour Down Under
 10th Overall Critérium du Dauphiné
2019
 1st Prueba Villafranca de Ordizia
2020
 9th Overall Route d'Occitanie

Grand Tour general classification results timeline

References

External links

1987 births
Living people
People from Cocentaina
Sportspeople from the Province of Alicante
Spanish male cyclists
Cyclists from the Valencian Community